Standard model may refer to:
 Standard Model of particle physics
 The mathematical formulation of the Standard Model of particle physics
 The Standard Solar Model of solar astrophysics
 The Lambda-CDM model, the standard model of big bang cosmology
 Standard model (cryptography)
 Intended interpretation of a syntactical system, called standard model in mathematical logic
 The standard models of set theory
 The Standard Model (Exhibition) held in Stockholm, 2009

See also 
 Cosmological model
 The Standardmodell rifle, a German weapon